The Communist Party is a cantonal political party in Switzerland active in Ticino and Grisons. From October 1944 until 2007, it acted as the Ticino section of the Swiss Party of Labour. In 2007, it decided to change its name to the Communist Party. In 2014, the party severed its ties with the Party of Labour. Its headquarters are in Locarno, Ticino.

History 
In 2014, the party stopped its collaboration with the Swiss Party of Labour after 70 years of affiliation. The cantonal party renamed itself, and is now mainly active in the canton of Ticino and in the canton of Grisons, with cells in Geneva and in other cities. The current General Secretary is Massimiliano Arif Ay, elected in 2009. It gained one seat in Ticino's parliament in 2015, and increased its seat count to 2 in 2019.

Youth wing 
The Swiss Communist Youth is the youth wing of the Communist Party. Its General Secretary is Luca Frei.

References

External links
 Official website (Italian)

Communism in Switzerland
Communist parties in Switzerland
Political parties in Switzerland
Ticino
Regionalist parties
Anti-imperialism in Europe
Anti-imperialist organizations
Political parties established in 1944
1944 establishments in Switzerland
Far-left political parties
Pacifism in Switzerland